"Mentira" (English: "Lie") is the first single from Karoll Márquez's upcoming EP, Dopamina. The song is a pop ballad and it was written by Márquez, Martina La Peligrosa, and Carlos Montaño (a member of the Colombian duo Siam). Márquez said "Mentira" was inspired as a tribute to the sentiments artists have to endure during dance auditions.

Music video 
The plot of the video is an homage to the dancing world, as it occurs in the midst of a dancing audition. The video was shot in Bogotá and directed by Daniel Jiménez.

The lyrics depict the anxiety felt by performance artists during an audition, as they are facing a potential rejection from a role.

References

External links
 Marquez's site at Spotify
 Song lyrics

Spanish-language songs
2020 songs